Al-Ghubayya al-Fawqa was a Palestinian Arab village in the Haifa Subdistrict. It was depopulated during the 1947–48 Civil War in Mandatory Palestine on April 8, 1948, during the Battle of Mishmar HaEmek. It was located 28 km southeast of Haifa.

History
During the  early Ottoman era, in 1596 the village appeared under the name of  Gubayya in  the  tax registers, being part of the nahiya (subdistrict) of Sahil Atlit  in the Sanjak (district) of Lajjun. It had a population of 39 households; an estimated 215 people,  all  Muslim. They paid a fixed  tax-rate of 25% on agricultural products, including wheat, barley, summer crops,  goats and beehives, and water buffaloes;  the taxes totalled 21,690  akçe.

Al-Ghubayya al-Fawqa shared an elementary school built by the Ottomans in 1888 with the nearby villages of al-Ghubayya-al-Tahta and al-Naghnaghiyya. The school was later closed during the British Mandate period. The village had its own mosque.

British Mandate era
In the 1922 census of Palestine, conducted by the British Mandate authorities, Ghabba al-Fuqa had a population of 41 Muslims. 
In the  1931 census, the two al-Ghubayya village were counted together, and the total population was 200 Muslims, in  38 houses.

In the 1945 statistics the population was  counted with the neighbouring  al-Ghubayya-al-Tahta and al-Naghnaghiyya, and together they had a population of 1,130 Muslims, with a total of 12,139  dunams of land  according to an official land and population survey.   Of this, 209 dunams were for plantations and irrigable land,  10,883 for cereals, while a total of 1,047 dunams were non-cultivable land.

1948 and aftermath
On 8 and 9 April 1948, the Haganah raided al-Ghubayya al-Fawqa,  al-Ghubayya-al-Tahta and Khirbet Beit Ras, and proceeded to blow them up in the following days. The report on 9 April from the  Golani Brigade stated that they were "preparing to destroy the villages when we evacuate them." They destroyed al-Ghubayya al-Fawqa the following night.

Following the war the area was incorporated into the State of Israel. By 1992 the kibbutz of Mishmar HaEmek was using some of al-Ghubayya al-Fawqa's former land as pastures.

References

Bibliography

  

 

al-Qawuqji, F. (1972): Memoirs  of al-Qawuqji, Fauzi in Journal of Palestine Studies 
"Memoirs, 1948, Part I" in 1, no. 4 (Sum. 72): 27-58., dpf-file, downloadable
"Memoirs, 1948, Part II" in 2, no. 1 (Aut. 72): 3-33., dpf-file, downloadable

External links
Welcome To al-Ghubayya al-Fawqa
 al-Ghubayya al-Fawqa,  Zochrot
Survey of Western Palestine, Map 8:  IAA, Wikimedia commons  
al-Ghubayya al-Fawqa, from the Khalil Sakakini Cultural Center
 Al-Ghubayya Al-Fouqa, from Dr. Moslih Kanaaneh
Remembering al-Ghubayyat, booklet about the al-Ghubayyat villages, 03/2010
 Tour to the al-Ghubayyat villages, by Umar Ighbariyye, 20.3.2010, Zochrot

Arab villages depopulated prior to the 1948 Arab–Israeli War
District of Haifa